Christopher Aziz Peace (born February 8, 1996) is an American football former coach and outside linebacker who is currently a graduate assistant for the Virginia Cavaliers. He played college football at Virginia and in the National Football League (NFL) for the Los Angeles Chargers and New York Giants.

Early life and high school
Peace was born in Norfolk, Virginia and grew up mostly in Chesapeake, Virginia. He attended Indian River High School through his sophomore year before transferring Warwick High School after his family moved to Newport News, Virginia. He transferred again to Denbigh High School before his senior year and was moved to linebacker after playing wide receiver and safety and recorded 20 sacks. Peace is married and has one son.

College career
Peace spent five seasons as a member of the Virginia Cavaliers, redshirting his freshman season. As a redshirt freshman he played  in 12 in all 12 of the Cavaliers' games, mostly as a reserve linebacker except for one start. The next season, Peace became a starter at outside linebacker and finished 5th on the team with 53 tackles and third with 6.5 tackles for loss and 2.0 sacks. As a redshirt junior, Peace was named honorable mention All-Atlantic Coast Conference (ACC) after tallying 68 tackles, 7.5 sacks (5th-most in the conference and most by a linebacker), and 10.5 tackles for a loss. In his final season at Virginia, he made 65 tackles (11.5 for loss) and again led all ACC linebackers with 7.5 sacks and was named third-team All-ACC.

Professional career

Los Angeles Chargers
Peace signed with the Los Angeles Chargers as an undrafted free agent on April 27, 2019. He made his NFL debut on September 8, 2019, in the Chargers' season opener against the Indianapolis Colts. He was waived on September 14, 2019, but was re-signed three days later. He was waived again on September 28, 2019.

New York Giants
On September 30, 2019, Peace was claimed off waivers by the New York Giants. He was placed on season ending injured reserve on December 7, 2019. Peace played in five games (one with the Chargers and four with the Giants) during his rookie season. He was waived on August 2, 2020.

Peace had a tryout with the Tennessee Titans on August 22, 2020.

Coaching career
Peace returned to Virginia as a defensive graduate assistant prior to the team's 2021 season.

References

External links
Virginia Cavaliers bio
New York Giants bio

1996 births
Living people
Players of American football from Virginia
Sportspeople from Chesapeake, Virginia
Sportspeople from Newport News, Virginia
American football defensive ends
Virginia Cavaliers football players
Los Angeles Chargers players
New York Giants players
Virginia Cavaliers football coaches